Baqerabad (also Romanized as Bāqerābād; also known as Bāqirābād) is a village in Olya Rural District, in the Central District of Ardestan County, Isfahan Province, Iran. At the 2006 census, its population was 220, in 61 families.

References 

Populated places in Ardestan County